The 2019 Bury Metropolitan Borough Council Election took place on 2 May 2019 to elect members of Bury Metropolitan Borough Council. This was on the same day as other local elections.

Election result
Changes compared with 2018 election.

Ward results
Candidates seeking re-election were last elected in 2015 and are denoted with an asterisk. Changes are compared to the 2018 results in that ward.

Besses

Church

East

Elton

Holyrood

Moorside

No Independent candidate as previous (-4.9).

North Manor

Pilkington Park

Radcliffe East

No Independent candidate as previous (-13.2).

Radcliffe North

Radcliffe West

Ramsbottom

Redvales

Sedgley

St. Mary's

Tottington

Unsworth

References

2019 English local elections
May 2019 events in the United Kingdom
2019
2010s in Greater Manchester